Bruce Cassiday (1920–2005) was an American writer and editor. He was the author and editor of pulp fiction, suspense and espionage stories, Gothics, medical melodramas, radio and TV dramas and novelizations, "how-to" books on landscaping, home carpentry, solar houses,  ghostwritten biographies, and reader's guides on detective, mystery and science-fiction literature.

He was married to Doris Galloway in 1950, and they had a son and a daughter. He died in Stamford, Connecticut, on January 12, 2005, of Parkinson's disease, from which he had suffered since 1999.

Works

Fiction series
Flash Gordon
 4: The Time Trap of Ming XIII (1974) as by Con Steffanson
 5: The Witch Queen of Mongo (1974) as by Carson Bingham
 6: The War of the Cybernauts (1975) as by Carson Bingham
Novels
 Gorgo (1960) as by Carson Bingham
 The Corpse in the Picture Window (1961)
 Angels Ten (1966)
Nonfiction
 The Illustrated History of Science Fiction (1989) with Dieter Wuckel
Essays
 My Life in the Pulps: Guest of Honor Speech, Pulpcon #23 (1996)

References

External links 
  under his own name, plus numerous linked pseudonyms
 

1920 births
2005 deaths
American editors
University of California, Los Angeles alumni
20th-century American male writers